Primal Quest is an expedition adventure race that has been called one of the most difficult athletic events in the world and was cited as the most prestigious expedition event in North America. Co-ed teams of four trail run, mountain bike, kayak, climb, rappel and mountaineer all while navigating all under their own power. The race has been in existence since 2001 and has been successfully revived following the loss of adventure racer Nigel Aylott. Each race lasts up to ten days, with winning teams completing the course in approximately six-eight days. The race once featured the largest prize purse in adventure racing.

Each team is required to carry a GPS monitoring device (without offering navigational assistance) which allows race organizers and spectators to track each team in real-time via the Internet on the Primal Quest website primalquest.org.

Race history
The first Primal Quest was held in 2002 in Telluride, Colorado.  In 2003, the race moved to Lake Tahoe and 2004 featured a course on Orcas Island, in the State of Washington.  CBS broadcast highlights of the race in 2003 and 2004 with a full feature episodic series on OLN. Primal Quest was the first expedition adventure race to be featured on major network television.

In June 2006 Primal Quest was hosted in the Utah desert  .  Disciplines included mountain biking, trekking, horseback riding, technical rope skills, mountaineering, kayaking and white water swimming. Primal Quest Utah was broadcast internationally as four one-hour episodes on ESPN2 and a one-hour recap and finale on ABC Sports. Subsequent races took place in 2008, Montana and 2009, South Dakota, 2015 in South Lake Tahoe, with episodes on Outside Television. 2018 crossed borders into Canada, and the feature documentary will be broadcast imminently.

Previous races

2002 Telluride
SoBe/SmartWool (Nike ACG/Balance Bar in 2003)
Team Montrail
Team GoLite (Nike ACG/Balance Bar in 2003)

2003 Lake Tahoe
Nike ACG/Balance Bar (was SoBe/Smartwool and GoLite)
AROC
Team Seagate

2004 Orcas Island
(tie) Seagate; Nike ACG/Balance Bar
Tie for 1st, no 2nd place

Holofiber

2006 Moab Utah
Nike PowerBlast (was Nike ACG/Balance Bar)
GoLite/Timberland
Merrell/Wigwam Adventure

2008 Montana
Nike (was Nike PowerBlast)
Merrell/Zanfel Adventure
Bones

2009 Badlands South Dakota
OrionHealth.com
Salomon/Crested Butte
Merrell/Zanfel Adventure

2015 Lake Tahoe California 
GODZone
Bones
Journey

2018 Squamish British Columbia 
Columbia Vidaraid GODZone
Bones
Quest Racing

External links
 Primal Quest Home Page
 Photo essay on the race
 Video of the 2006 race
 Information on 2006 Primal Quest Video
 Study on Primal Quest Participants
 Account of participant in PQ 2008

Notes

Adventure racing
Multisports in the United States
Multisports in Canada